Ellie Cornell (born December 15, 1963) is an American actress and producer. She made her film debut in the 1988 film Married to the Mob before becoming known for her roles as Rachel Carruthers in Halloween 4: The Return of Michael Myers (1988) and Halloween 5: The Revenge of Michael Myers (1989), and as Detective Janet Wright in the TV series Femme Fatales.

Filmography

Producer
Free Enterprise (1998) executive producer, as Ellie Gottwald
Where No Fan Has Gone Before: The Making of Free Enterprise (1999)  executive producer, as Ellie Gottwald
The Specials (2000)

External links

Ellie Cornell website The Ellie Effect

1963 births
Actresses from New York (state)
American film actresses
Film producers from New York (state)
American television actresses
Living people
People from Glen Cove, New York
Rollins College alumni
American women film producers
21st-century American women